Holedeč is a municipality and village in Louny District in the Ústí nad Labem Region of the Czech Republic. It has about 600 inhabitants.

Administrative parts
Villages of Holedeček, Stránky and Veletice are administrative parts of Holedeč.

References

Villages in Louny District